Safi Airways Co. was the first and largest privately owned airline from Afghanistan. The airline had its headquarters in Shahr-e-Naw, Kabul, Afghanistan, an administrative office in the Dubai Airport Free Zone.

History

Safi Airways has been founded as a subsidiary of the Safi Group and in 2006 by its chairman and CEO, Ghulam Hazrat Safi. On 15 June 2009, Safi Airways commenced operations between the Afghan capital, Kabul, and Frankfurt Airport, Germany. This service was however suspended on 24 November 2010 due to an EU ban barring all Afghan carriers from flying into Europe and did since never resume.

On 5 November 2009, Safi Airways took delivery of a pre-owned Airbus A340-300, which was phased out after suspension of the Frankfurt route due to the EU ban. In 2011, Safi Airways replaced their Boeing 737-300 aircraft with Airbus A32x aircraft. They intended to acquire an Airbus A330 for long haul routes in 2016 which however did not take place.

Since February 2012, Safi Airways is the first Afghan airline to operate in compliance with European Aviation Safety Agency (EASA) requirements, IOSA (IATA Operational Safety Audit) and ICAO (International Civil Aviation Organization). 2015 Safi Airways featured Bahari Ibaadat Miss Afghanistan 2014 in their Inflight magazine

On 5 September 2016, Afghan authorities forced Safi Airways to suspend all operations over unpaid debt and disbanding.

Destinations
As of September 2018, Safi Airways served the following destinations:

Fleet

Current fleet

As of October 2016, the Safi Airways fleet consisted of the following aircraft:

Former fleet
Safi Airways previously operated the following aircraft:

References

External links

Official website

Airlines formerly banned in the European Union
Defunct airlines of Afghanistan
Airlines established in 2006
Airlines disestablished in 2018
2006 establishments in Afghanistan
2010s disestablishments in Afghanistan